Antoine-Laurent Baudron (15 May 1742 – 1834), was a French musician and composer.

Career
Born in Amiens, Baudron studied in the local Jesuit college and then moved to Paris to study the violin with Pierre Gaviniès.

In 1763 or 1764 he became a member of the orchestra of the Comédie Française where he became head violinist ("premier violon") in 1766. He soon began to write incidental music for the company's plays and was the first to write music to Beaumarchais's plays The Barber of Seville and The Marriage of Figaro.

Baudron is mainly remembered for having been the first to introduce instrumental interludes between the acts of a play that took up the mood of the scenes on the stage. These were realised at the Comédie Française from 1777 onwards. He also wrote the first known French string quartets (in 1768). He retired around 1822 and died in Paris.

Bibliography
 Thomas Bauman and Marita McClymands: Opera and the Enlightenment (Cambridge: Cambridge University Press, 2006).

References

External links
 http://composers-classical-music.com/b/BaudronAntoineLaurent.htm
 https://web.archive.org/web/20080415224152/http://www.musisca-publishing.co.uk/

1742 births
1834 deaths
18th-century classical composers
18th-century French composers
19th-century classical composers
19th-century French composers
18th-century French male classical violinists
Comédie-Française
19th-century French male classical violinists
French male composers
People from Amiens
String quartet composers